BYB or byb may stand for:

 Back Yard Burgers
 IATA code Dibba Airport
 Byb Berlin Turkish composer